Michael Engleman (born May 20, 1958 in Sonoma, California) is a former American cyclist.

Palmares

1987
1st stage 8 Coors Classic
1988
1st stage 14 Coors Classic
1989
2nd National Road Race Championships
1990
1st Cascade Classic
1st stages 1 and 2
1991
1st Bob Cook Memorial-Mount Evans
1st Thrift Drug Classic
1st stages 1 and 6 Cascade Classic
1st Herald Sun Tour
1st stages 8 and 13
1st Vuelta de Bisbee
1st stage 4
2nd Cascade Classic
3rd Tour du Limousin
1992
1st Bob Cook Memorial-Mount Evans
3rd Cascade Classic
1st Prologue
1st Chur - Arosa
1st Tour of the Adirondacks
1st Nevada City Classic
2nd Vuelta de Bisbee
3rd Coors Classic
1993
1st Bob Cook Memorial-Mount Evans
1st stage 1 Cascade Classic
1st Killington Stage Race  
1st Prologue and stage 1
1st stage 1 Tour of Willamette
2nd National Criterium Championships
2nd West Virginia Classic
1994
1st Bob Cook Memorial-Mount Evans
1st Cascade Classic
1st Killington Stage Race 
1st Prologue and stage 2
2nd Tour de Toona
3rd National Road Race Championships
1995
1st Bob Cook Memorial-Mount Evans
1st Cascade Classic  
1st stage 2
1st Fitchburg Longsjo Classic
1st Prologue Killington Stage Race
1st Tour de Toona
1st stage 3
1st Nevada City Classic
8th World Time Trial Championship
1997
3rd Killington Stage Race
1998
1st Nevada City Classic
2nd Colorado Classic

References

1958 births
Living people
American male cyclists